Karlstrøm is a surname. Notable people with the surname include:

Åshild Karlstrøm Rundhaug (born 1955), Norwegian politician
Cornelius Karlstrøm (1897–1978), Norwegian politician
Jacob Karlstrøm (born 1997), Norwegian footballer
Randi Karlstrøm (born 1960), Norwegian politician
Steinar Karlstrøm (born 1965), Norwegian politician

See also
Karlström